The Romanian Figure Skating Championships is a figure skating competition held annually to crown the national championships of Romania.

Medalists
*: Results were taken from that season's Crystal Skate of Romania competition.

Men

Ladies

Pairs

References

External links
 Romanian Skating Federation
 
 historic results

 
Figure skating national championships
Figure skating in Romania
Figure Skating